Otley railway station was a railway station serving the town of Otley in West Yorkshire, England.

History
It was opened as a joint venture on the Otley and Ilkley Joint Railway, constructed by the North Eastern Railway and the Midland Railway, on 1 February 1865. The station was closed on 22 March 1965. Tracks and buildings have been removed since. The Otley branch line joined Arthington, in the east, to Ilkley and Menston in the west via a junction known as Milnerwood. The length of the line was about six miles and spanned a range of terrain at the foot of The Chevin with a substantial cutting through a sandstone ridge near Milnerwood which can still be seen today by walking the footpath along the old track bed.

In January 2019, Campaign for Better Transport released a report identifying the line via Otley which was listed as Priority 2 for reopening. Priority 2 is for those lines which require further development or a change in circumstances (such as housing developments).

The trackbed between Burley in Wharfedale, Otley and Pool is to become a cycleway, footpath and equestrian route known as the Wharfedale Greenway, with possible extensions onward to Ilkley alongside the extant railway. Planning permission for the first phase of the greenway was granted in July 2020.

Station masters

W. Fox 1865
Mr. Fry ca. 1870
John Deans ca. 1874 - 1903 (afterwards station master at Boroughbridge, died shortly after appointment)
G.P. Heggs 1903 - 1911
Edwin James Deverell 1911 - 1925
Oliver J. Rignall 1925 - 1931 (formerly station master at Newlay and Horsforth, from 1929 also station master at Burley-in-Wharfdale, afterwards station master at Lancaster Castle)

References

External links
 Information and pictures about Otley Station
 Otley station on navigable 1947 O. S. map
 Railway junction diagram showing the Otley branch line in 1914

Disused railway stations in Leeds
Former Otley and Ilkley Joint Railway stations
Railway stations in Great Britain opened in 1865
Railway stations in Great Britain closed in 1965
Beeching closures in England
Otley
1865 establishments in England
1965 disestablishments in England